Vallée de l'Ernz is a commune in northern Luxembourg, in the canton of Diekirch.

The commune of Vallée de l'Ernz was formed on 1 January 2012 from the former communes of Ermsdorf and Medernach.  The law creating the Vallée de l'Ernz was passed on 24 May 2011. It has an area of 39.73 km2.

Populated places
The commune consists of the following villages:

 Ermsdorf Section:
 Eppeldorf
 Ermsdorf
 Folkendeng
 Keiwelbach
 Stegen
 Backesmillen (lieu-dit)
 Bricherheck (lieu-dit)
 Bricherhaff (lieu-dit)
 Gilcher (lieu-dit)
 Hessemillen (lieu-dit)
 Hoossebierg (lieu-dit)
 Moderhaff (lieu-dit)
 Neimillen (lieu-dit)
 Reisermillen (lieu-dit)
 Spierberich (lieu-dit)
 Webeschhaff (lieu-dit)

 Medernach Section:
 Medernach
 Marxberg
 Ousterbur
 Pletschette
 Savelborn - part of the farm belongs to the commune of Waldbillig
 Kitzebur

Population

References

External links
 

Communes in Diekirch (canton)